Rungsted Ishockey Klub is a Danish ice hockey club from Rungsted. 
The elite team is called Rungsted Seier Capital.

History
The club was founded in 1941.

Nordsjælland Cobras
The Nordsjælland Cobras was the elite team for Rungsted Ishockey Klub and played in the top Danish ice hockey league AL-Bank Ligaen. After filing for  bankruptcy at the end of the 2009-2010 season, the team was excluded from the following season.

They changed name from the Rungsted Cobras to the Nordsjælland Cobras in 2004, but they are still based in Rungsted. The team won the Danish national championship in 2003.

According to the club, the shortfall is due to sponsorship money that has not been paid due and the current economic crisis has left club owners unable to cover the shortfall. In an effort to help, Cobras' arch-rival Rødovre Mighty Bulls has announced it will play an exhibition game during the national team break (now through February 10) against the Cobras, with all proceeds going to the Cobras. On 7 April 2011 they announced that they will delay their comeback to AL-Bank Ligaen by a year.

Squad 2018-19
Goaltenders

Defenders

4 Joachim Holten
13 Casper Brandis
47 Thomas Johnsen

Forwards

10 Nick Samsøe
12 Lasse Degn
18 Kasper Weis
22 Andreas Sabroe

Staff
 Head Coach: Gunnar Leidborg

Former players
 Kory Baker
 Peter Becher Nielsen
 Fraser Clair
 Brad DeFauw
 Kasper Degn
 Lasse Degn
 Kerry Ellis-Toddington
 Magnus Eriksson
 Milan Gajic
 Emil Jensen
 Anders Joensen
 Niklas Karmhag
 Tobias Kisum
 Grady Moore
 Peter Nielsen
 Mikko Niinikoski
 Johan Olsson
 Nicklas Plambeck
 Christoffer Rasmussen
 Mattias Remstam
 Jonathan Sjölund
 Daniel Wallin
 John Wikström

References

External links
official website, Rungsted Ishockey Klub
official website, Rungsted Seier Capital

Ice hockey teams in Denmark
Ice hockey teams in the Øresund Region